Ledenika Peak is the peak rising to 1020 m in Srednogorie Heights on Trinity Peninsula, Antarctic Peninsula.  Situated 2.68 km southwest of Razvigor Peak, 6 km southeast of Hanson Hill, 6.66 km east of Wimple Dome and 10.89 km north-northwest of Sirius Knoll.  Surmounting Malorad Glacier to the north and Russell West Glacier to the south.

The peak is named after Ledenika Cave in northwestern Bulgaria.

Location
German-British mapping in 1996.

Maps
 Trinity Peninsula. Scale 1:250000 topographic map No. 5697. Institut für Angewandte Geodäsie and British Antarctic Survey, 1996.
 Antarctic Digital Database (ADD). Scale 1:250000 topographic map of Antarctica. Scientific Committee on Antarctic Research (SCAR), 1993–2016.

References
 Bulgarian Antarctic Gazetteer. Antarctic Place-names Commission. (details in Bulgarian, basic data in English)
 Ledenika Peak. SCAR Composite Antarctic Gazetteer

External links
 Ledenika Peak. Copernix satellite image

Mountains of Trinity Peninsula
Bulgaria and the Antarctic